Windsor Creek is a locality in northern Alberta, Canada within the County of Grande Prairie No. 1. It was named for its proximity to the creek of the same name and it had a post office dating to October 1929.

References

Localities in the County of Grande Prairie No. 1